George Washington Crosby  (September 1, 1857 – January 9, 1913) was a Major League Baseball pitcher. He played for Chicago White Stockings in the  season.

External links

Chicago White Stockings players
1857 births
1913 deaths
Baseball players from Idaho
19th-century baseball players